Ryang Myong-il (born 31 July 1987) is a North Korean footballer. He represented North Korea on at least eleven occasions between 2003 and 2010, scoring once.

Career

In 2009, Ryang signed for Chengdu Blades.

Career statistics

Club

Notes

International

International goals
Scores and results list North Korea's goal tally first, score column indicates score after each North Korea goal.

References

1987 births
Living people
North Korean footballers
North Korea international footballers
Association football defenders
Chinese Super League players
April 25 Sports Club players
Wolmido Sports Club players
Chengdu Tiancheng F.C. players
North Korean expatriate footballers
North Korean expatriate sportspeople in China
Expatriate footballers in China